"The Clock" is a 1953 song by Johnny Ace with the Beale Streeters. It describes a man feeling lonely while he watches the clock. "The Clock" was Johnny Ace's third release to reach the U.S. R&B chart and second number one.

Aretha Franklin released a version of the song in 1969 as the B-side to her single, "Share Your Love with Me".

References
 

1953 songs
1953 singles
1969 singles
Johnny Ace songs
Aretha Franklin songs